Brogan Walker-Sanchez (born August 2, 1988) is an American mixed martial artist, currently competing in the Flyweight division in the  Ultimate Fighting Championship (UFC). She has previously fought for Invicta Fighting Championships.

Background 
Walker-Sanchez was born in California, United States. She moved to Guam after she married her Guamanian husband, Mike Sanchez. She represents Guam when competing in MMA.

Mixed martial arts career

Early career 
Walker-Sanchez fought under Pacific Xtreme Combat and amassed a record of 4-0 prior to getting signed by Invicta Fighting Championships.

Invicta Fighting Championships 
Walker-Sanchez made her Invicta debut on January 13, 2018, against Cheri Muraski at Invicta FC 27. She won the fight via split decision.

Her next fight came on July 21, 2018, facing Miranda Maverick at Invicta FC 30. She won the fight via unanimous decision.

On October 4, 2019, Walker-Sanchez faced Pearl Gonzalez at Invicta FC 37. She lost the fight via unanimous decision.

Walker-Sanchez faced Erin Blanchfield at Invicta FC 41 on July 30, 2020, as a late notice replacement for Stephanie Geltmacher. She lost the fight by unanimous decision.

Walker-Sanchez faced Emilee King at Invicta FC 44 on August 27, 2021. She won the fight by a first-round submission, forcing King to tap with a rear naked choke near the end of the round.

The Ultimate Fighter
In February 2022, Walker-Sanchez was announced as a cast member of The Ultimate Fighter: Team Peña vs. Team Nunes. She was selected third by Julianna Peña in the fighter selections. In her first fight in the house, she faced Hannah Guy and won by majority decision. In the semi-finals, she faced Laura Gallardo and won by unanimous decision to advance to the finals.

Ultimate Fighting Championship
In the TUF 30 finals, Walker-Sanchez faced Juliana Miller on August 6, 2022 at UFC on ESPN 40. She lost the fight via technical knockout in round three.

Walker-Sanchez is scheduled to face Liang Na on March 25, 2023, at UFC on ESPN 43.

Mixed martial arts record 

|-
|Loss
| style="text-align:center | 7–3
|Juliana Miller
|TKO (punches and elbows)
|UFC on ESPN: Santos vs. Hill
|
| style="text-align:center | 3
| style="text-align:center | 3:57
|Las Vegas, Nevada, United States
|
|-
|Win
| style="text-align:center | 7–2
|Emilee King
|Submission (rear-naked choke)
|Invicta FC 44
|
| style="text-align:center | 1
| style="text-align:center | 4:28
|Kansas City, Kansas, United States
|
|-
|Loss
| style="text-align:center | 6–2
|Erin Blanchfield
|Decision (unanimous)
|Invicta FC 41
|
| style="text-align:center | 3
| style="text-align:center | 5:00
|Kansas City, Kansas, United States
|
|-
|Loss
| style="text-align:center | 6–1
|Pearl Gonzalez
|Decision (unanimous)
|Invicta FC 37
|
| style="text-align:center | 3
| style="text-align:center | 5:00
|Kansas City, Kansas, United States
|
|-
|Win
| style="text-align:center | 6–0
|Miranda Maverick
|Decision (unanimous)
|Invicta FC 30
|
| style="text-align:center | 3
| style="text-align:center | 5:00
|Kansas City, Missouri, United States
|
|-
|Win
| style="text-align:center | 5–0
|Cheri Muraski
|Decision (split)
|Invicta FC 27
|
| style="text-align:center | 3
| style="text-align:center | 5:0
|Kansas City, Missouri, United States
| 
|-
|Win
| style="text-align:center | 4–0
|Kate Da Silva
|Decision (unanimous)
|Pacific Xtreme Combat 54
|
| style="text-align:center | 3
| style="text-align:center | 5:00
|Mangila, Guam
|
|-
|Win
| style="text-align:center | 3–0
|Emiko Raika
|Decision (unanimous)
|Pacific Xtreme Combat 50
|
| style="text-align:center | 3
| style="text-align:center | 5:00
|Mangila, Guam
| 
|-
|Win
| style="text-align:center | 2–0
|Gabby Romero
|Decision (unanimous)
|Pacific Xtreme Combat 49
|
| style="text-align:center | 3
| style="text-align:center | 5:00
|Mangila, Guam
| 
|-
|Win
| style="text-align:center | 1–0
|Yoo Jin Jung
|Decision (unanimous)
|Pacific Xtreme Combat 45
|
| style="text-align:center | 3
| style="text-align:center | 5:00
|Mangila, Guam
|
|}

|-
|Win
|align=center|2–0
| Laura Gallardo
| Decision (unanimous)
| rowspan=2|The Ultimate Fighter: Team Peña vs. Team Nunes
| (airdate)
|align=center|3
|align=center|5:00
| rowspan=2|Las Vegas, Nevada, United States
|
|-
|Win
|align=center|1–0
| Hannah Guy
| Decision (majority)
| (airdate)
|align=center|2
|align=center|5:00
|
|-

See also 
 List of current UFC fighters

References

External links 
 
 Brogan Walker-Sanchez at Invicta FC

Living people
1988 births
American female mixed martial artists
Flyweight mixed martial artists
Mixed martial artists utilizing Brazilian jiu-jitsu
American practitioners of Brazilian jiu-jitsu
Female Brazilian jiu-jitsu practitioners
People awarded a black belt in Brazilian jiu-jitsu
Sportspeople from California
21st-century American women